Spider-Man is a fictional superhero from Marvel who has been adapted and appeared in various media including television shows, films, toys, stage shows, books, and video games.

Television

Spider-Man has been adapted to television many times, as a short-lived live-action television series, a Japanese tokusatsu series, and several animated cartoon series. There were also the "Spidey Super Stories" segments on the PBS educational series The Electric Company, which featured a Spider-Man (played by Danny Seagren) who did not speak out loud but instead used only word balloons.

Animated series
 Spider-Man's first cartoon series ran from 1967 to 1970, starring Paul Soles as the titular character. 
 In Spider-Woman, Spider-Man appeared in "Pyramids of Terror" and "the Kongo Spider", again voiced by Soles.
 Two Spider-Man cartoons aired on television in 1981: the syndicated series Spider-Man which ran for one 26-episode season, and the more popular Spider-Man and His Amazing Friends, which aired on the NBC network for three seasons, ultimately totaling 24 episodes.

 Spider-Man: The Animated Series ran for five seasons from 1994 to 1998, totaling 65 episodes, on Fox Broadcasting's afternoon programming block, "Fox Kids", with Christopher Daniel Barnes voicing Spider-Man. 
 Spider-Man Unlimited debuted in 1999, ending after one season, with Rino Romano voicing Spider-Man.
 Spider-Man: The New Animated Series ran from July 11 to September 9, 2003 on MTV, with Neil Patrick Harris providing Peter Parker's voice.
 The next series, The Spectacular Spider-Man, premiered on March 8, 2008, and ran two seasons, with Josh Keaton voicing Peter Parker/Spider-Man.
 Ultimate Spider-Man began airing on Disney XD in 2012, with Drake Bell voicing Peter Parker/Spider-Man. This version has him team up with Iron Fist, Nova, Luke Cage and White Tiger while undergoing training with S.H.I.E.L.D.
 Spider-Man appears in some episodes of Avengers Assemble, voiced again by Drake Bell in season one and two and by Robbie Daymond in season five.
 Spider-Man appears in some episodes of Hulk and the Agents of S.M.A.S.H. voiced again by Drake Bell.
 Spider-Man appears as a supporting character in the 2014 anime series Marvel Disk Wars: The Avengers, voiced by Shinji Kawada in Japanese and Robbie Daymond in English.
 Spider-Man, a new Spider-Man animated series was announced in October 2016 to replace Ultimate Spider-Man, with Robbie Daymond voicing Spider-Man.
 Spider-Man appears in the Guardians of the Galaxy episodes "Back in the New York Groove" and "Drive Me Carnage," voiced again by Robbie Daymond.
 Spider-Man appears in several episodes of the 2017 anime series Marvel Future Avengers, reprised by Shinji Kawada in Japanese and Robbie Daymond in English.
 Spider-Man appears in Spidey and His Amazing Friends, voiced by Benjamin Valic.
 Spider-Man appears in two Marvel Cinematic Universe (MCU) Disney+ animated series.
 What If...? (2021) features an alternate version marketed "Zombie Hunter Spidey", voiced by Hudson Thames instead of Tom Holland due to scheduling conflicts.
 The character will appear in Spider-Man: Freshman Year, an animated prequel series set before the events of Captain America: Civil War.

Live-action series
 From 1978 to 1979, Nicholas Hammond starred as Peter Parker/Spider-Man in the live-action television series The Amazing Spider-Man. The short-lived series, which had started out as a TV film in 1977, was created before the popular The Incredible Hulk television series of the same decade, and ran for two abbreviated seasons consisting of 13 episodes during the 1977/1978 and 1978/1979 seasons. The series concluded with a two-hour episode on July 6, 1979.
  is Spider-Man in the Japanese Spider-Man television series, produced by Toei Company.

Film

Live-action

Early films 
 Nicholas Hammond portrayed the character in the 1970s The Amazing Spider-Man TV series, with three films being theatrically released in Europe from 1977 to 1981.
 Spider-Man (1977)
 Spider-Man Strikes Back (1978)
 Spider-Man: The Dragon's Challenge (1981)
 Spider-Man (1978) is a Japanese film based on the 1978 TV series of the same name, starring the alternate Spider-Man Takuya Yamishiro.
 
Following The Dragon's Challenge, no theatrical films were released until Sam Raimi's Spider-Man trilogy.

Sam Raimi's Spider-Man series 

 In 2002, Columbia Pictures released the origin feature film Spider-Man, kicking off a trilogy directed solely by Raimi. The film stars Tobey Maguire as the titular character, with Willem Dafoe co starring as Norman Osborn / Green Goblin. 
 Maguire reprised his role in the 2004 sequel Spider-Man 2, adapting elements from the comic book storyline "Spider-Man No More". Alfred Molina co-stars as Otto Octavius / Doctor Octopus.
 Maguire further reprised his role as Spider-Man in Spider-Man 3 (2007), which ultimately ended the trilogy. Thomas Haden Church, James Franco, and Topher Grace co-star as Flint Marko / Sandman, Harry Osborn / New Goblin, and Eddie Brock / Venom, respectively. 
 From 2008 to 2010, Sony and Raimi were developing further sequels to Spider-Man 3. However, many issues surfaced over Spider-Man 4, leading Sony to cancel it in 2010. 4 was originally scheduled to release in 2011.

The Amazing Spider-Man film series 

 Following the cancelation of Spider-Man 4, Sony rebooted the series with The Amazing Spider-Man (2012), directed by Marc Webb. In July 2010, Andrew Garfield was cast as the titular character, co-starring with Rhys Ifans as Dr. Curt Connors / Lizard, and Emma Stone as love interest Gwen Stacy. 
 Max Charles portrayed a young Peter Parker in the opening scene of the film.
 Sony planned The Amazing Spider-Man to start a shared universe, competing with other studios' universes (such as the Marvel Cinematic Universe (MCU) franchise), with The Amazing Spider-Man 2 (2014). Garfield and Stone reprise their roles while co-starring with Jamie Foxx, Dane DeHaan, and Paul Giamatti as Max Dillon / Electro, Harry Osborn / Green Goblin, and Aleksei Sytsevich / Rhino, respectively.
 Charles also reprised the role of young Parker.
 Following the underwhelming box office performance and critical reception of The Amazing Spider-Man 2, Sony cancelled their shared universe and the proposed Sinister Six spinoff, originally scheduled for 2016 and 2018, respectively.

Marvel Cinematic Universe 

Sony, Marvel Studios and The Walt Disney Company announced in February 2015 a deal for Spider-Man to appear in the MCU, with Tom Holland portraying the character.
 Before his official debut in Captain America: Civil War (2016), Parker previously appears and is referenced.
 In Iron Man 2 (2010), Max Favreau (son of director Jon Favreau) portrays a young boy in a child's Iron Man mask standing bravely in front of Justin Hammer's drones. Holland confirmed in 2017 that it was retroactively decided the boy was a young Parker.
 The first reference to Spider-Man within the Marvel Cinematic Universe following the deal with Sony is at the end of Ant-Man (2015). According to director Peyton Reed, the reference is made by a reporter who says to Sam Wilson (who is looking for Ant-Man), "Well, we got everything nowadays. We got a guy who jumps, we got a guy who swings, we got a guy who crawls up the walls, you gotta be more specific".
 Peter Parker's first on-screen MCU appearance is in Captain America: Civil War (2016), when Tony Stark recruits him to fight alongside his faction of the Avengers during the Avengers Civil War. In the post-credits scene, he fiddles with a device that projects the Spider Signal on the ceiling of his bedroom.
 In Spider-Man: Homecoming, directed by Jon Watts, Parker balances his high school life with his duties as Spider-Man, while being mentored by Tony Stark and battling Adrian Toomes / Vulture. The Spider-Man suit that he gained from Stark has its own AI, which he names Karen (voiced by Jennifer Connelly).
 Holland reprises his role as Peter Parker / Spider-Man in the two-part conclusion to Phase Three, the two Avengers films Avengers: Infinity War (2018) and Avengers: Endgame (2019).
 In Infinity War, Parker joins Stark, Stephen Strange, Peter Quill, Drax, Mantis and Nebula in combating Thanos on the planet Titan while wearing the Iron Spider armor and later becomes a victim of the Blip.
 In Endgame, Spider-Man restored to life right before the Battle of Earth, to which he fights in the battle, which results in Stark sacrificing himself to kill Thanos and his army. Peter later mourns his mentor's loss alongside James Rhodes and Pepper Potts, attending his funeral with his aunt May.
 Holland reprises his role in Spider-Man: Far From Home (2019), following him on a school trip to Europe where Nick Fury and Quentin Beck enlist his help in battling the Elementals, before discovering this lie. In a mid-credits scene, he is framed for Mysterio's drone attack in London and his identity is exposed to the world by J. Jonah Jameson of TheDailyBugle.net.
 The home media release of Far From Home features a short film titled Peter's To-Do List, which were scenes cut from the theaterical release.
 Holland reprises his role in Spider-Man: No Way Home (2021), following Parker after his identity being exposed in Far From Home. The film deals with the concept of the Multiverse, allowing previous Spider-Man actors to reprise their roles such as Maguire and Garfield to their versions of the character, named "Peter-Two" and "Peter-Three" respectively to differentiate from Holland's Parker ("Peter-One"), ultimately appearing with Dafoe, Molina, Church, Ifans, and Foxx also reprising their roles of Osborn, Octavius, Marko, Connors, and Dillon from the Raimi and Amazing Spider-Man films.
 Prior to No Way Home release, Sony executive Amy Pascal stated in an interview with Fandango that a new trilogy of Spider-Man films was in development at Sony and Marvel Studios, but Pascal and Marvel Studios president Kevin Feige later clarified that while they planned to develop more Spider-Man films starring Holland, development was yet to begin.

Other appearances 
 Holland makes an uncredited cameo appearance in the mid-credits scene of the Sony's Spider-Man Universe film Venom: Let There Be Carnage (2021).
 In the second mid-credits scene from the 2022 film Morbius, Adrian Toomes' Vulture mentions suspecting Spider-Man as the cause of him being pulled from his Earth.

Animation 
 Spider-Man appears in the Lego Marvel Super Heroes films.
 The character debuts in Maximum Overload, voiced by Drake Bell.
 In Avengers Reassembled, where the character is voiced by Benjamin Diskin, He and Iron Spider discover a shrunken Yellowjacket on a web while training on the S.H.I.E.L.D. Helicarrier. They did help the Avengers get a confession from Yellowjacket about Ultron's plans.
 A main and Noir versions of Peter Parker / Spider-Man appear in Spider-Man: Into the Spider-Verse (2018), produced by Sony Pictures Animation and directed by Bob Persichetti; respectively voiced by Jake Johnson and Nicolas Cage. Chris Pine also voices a version of Peter Parker in the film that is similar to his Earth-1610 counterpart. Johnson will voice the main version in the upcoming sequel Spider-Man: Across the Spider-Verse (2023).

Novels and books

Spider-Man features in three original Marvel novels published in the 1970s by Pocket Books -- Mayhem in Manhattan by Len Wein and Marv Wolfman, and Crime Campaign and Murder Moon, both by Paul Kupperberg. In the 1990s, Byron Preiss published a series of novels based on Marvel Comics, edited by Keith R. A. DeCandido, and written by various authors including Adam-Troy Castro, Tom DeFalco, and Diane Duane; Preiss also published two Spider-Man short-story anthologies. Byron Preiss' license eventually lapsed, and the new licensee, Pocket Star (an imprint of Pocket Books), released Down These Mean Streets, by DeCandido, in 2005. In 2006, they released The Darkest Hours by Jim Butcher, and in 2007, Drowned in Thunder by Christopher L. Bennett. Some of the Preiss novels were team-ups with other Marvel characters (including the X-Men, Iron Man, and the Hulk), while others were solo adventures. The Byron Preiss novels shared a common continuity and occasionally referenced events in earlier novels, while later novels included a time-line.

A number of Spider-Man children's books have also been published, from early readers and picture books to novels. Guide books include DK Publishing's Spider-Man: The Ultimate Guide, by Tom DeFalco and Spider-Man: Inside the World of Your Friendly Neighborhood Hero by Matthew K. Manning.

Motion comics
Spider-Man appears in the Spider-Woman motion comics. In this series, he is voiced by Geoff Boothby.

Comic strips
 The daily newspaper comic strip The Amazing Spider-Man debuted on January 3, 1977.
 Mr. and Mrs. Spider-Man was published in 2008.
 Spider-Man met the Peanuts characters in two strips published in The Romita Legacy. In one, Spider-Man webs up Lucy so Charlie Brown can kick the football while in the other he webs up Snoopy and spins him around as a prank.

Radios
In 1995, BBC Radio commissioned a Spider-Man radio play which aired on BBC Radio 1 over 50 episodes on week days between January 15, 1996, and March 24, 1996. The performance was co-produced by Brian May, who also contributed to the musical arrangement and wrote and performed the theme tune.

The scope of the story included a number of familiar characters from the Spider-Man comic books as well as key figures from the Marvel Universe such as the Fantastic Four, Namor the Submariner, and Doctor Doom. The role of Spider-Man was performed by William Dufris. The cast list included EastEnders star Anita Dobson.

Live performances

In 1987 Marvel staged a mock wedding at Shea Stadium as publicity stunt to promote the wedding issue of The Amazing Spider-Man.

A Spider-Man balloon appeared in the Macy's Thanksgiving Day Parade from 1984 to 1998. A newer version also appeared from 2009 to 2014.

At the Butlins family entertainment resorts in the United Kingdom, a musical titled Spider-Man On Stage played in 1999. The show contained music by Henry Marsh and Phil Pickett and a book and lyrics by David H. Bell. The original cast album by Varios Records runs 44 minutes.

In 2002, the company 2MA produced the first live-action Spider-Man Stunt Show, Spider-Man Stunt Show: A Stunt Spectacular staged in Jeddah, Saudi Arabia. The same show played at Thorpe Park in Surrey, England in 2003 and 2004. Spider-Man has also made stage appearances in Pantomime at the Birmingham Hippodrome Theatre and the Churchill Theatre, Bromley, United Kingdom. In 2003 a similar stage show called Spider-Man Live! toured North America.

At Universal Studios Hollywood in Los Angeles, a musical stage version (loosely based on the 2002 live-action film and based on the comics) titled Spider-Man Rocks! was produced, combined singing and action stunt sequences similar to a Broadway musical. The attraction ran from May 2002 to August 2004, when it was replaced by Fear Factor Live! Because it is loosely based on the 2002 film, Green Goblin is basically in his comic book form instead of his movie form.

A Broadway musical titled Spider-Man: Turn Off the Dark opened at the Foxwoods Theatre in New York on June 14, 2011. The show is directed by Julie Taymor and features music by Bono and The Edge. The production stars Reeve Carney, Jennifer Damiano, T.V. Carpio and Patrick Page. The musical is the most expensive piece of live theatre to date, and features high-flying action sequences and stunts. It holds the record for the most preview performances, with 182 before its opening.

Spider-Man is featured in Marvel Universe Live!, a 2014 arena show.

Spider-Man, and other Marvel characters, currently make live appearances in Hollywoodland at Disney California Adventure.

Video games

Dozens of computer and video games starring Spider-Man have been released for over 15 different gaming platforms.

The Amazing Spider-Man, a puzzle-oriented action game developed by Oxford Digital Enterprises and released in 1990 for the Amiga, then later ported to PC:DOS, Commodore 64, and Atari ST. The title was published by Paragon Software Corporation and features over 250 screens.

In 1990, The Amazing Spider-Man vs. The Kingpin, developed and published by Sega, premiered on the Sega Master System and was later ported to the Mega Drive/Genesis in 1991, the Sega Game Gear in 1992, and the Sega Mega-CD in 1993. Fundamentally, the game is the same on each platform with each iteration including new levels, enhanced graphics and a few incremental improvements to the game play. The story involves Spider-Man trying to collect six keys from six villains to defuse a bomb in New York planted by the Kingpin. Spider-Man has a finite supply of webfluid and the only way to replenish is to take photos, most profitably of the supervillains, to sell to the Daily Bugle.

The Amazing Spider-Man is the title of a video game released for the original Nintendo Game Boy. It was published in 1990 by LJN Ltd. (a subsidiary of Acclaim), and developed by Rare. It is a platform side scrolling action game. The game play involves running across New York chasing supervillains to locate Mary Jane Watson.

The Amazing Spider-Man 2 was released the following year and was developed by B.I.T.S. The game is a side-scrolling beat-'em up. Spider-Man attempts to clear his name after he is accused of a crime committed by the Hobgoblin. In 1993, B.I.T.S. released the third in the series titled, The Amazing Spider-Man 3: Invasion of the Spider-Slayers.

As well as various games based on the Spider-Man license, Spider-Man has also appeared in a few cross-over titles. He appears as a guest character in X-Men: Mutant Academy 2 and Tony Hawk's Pro Skater 2.

Spider-Man appears in Marvel: Ultimate Alliance voiced by Quinton Flynn. He is one of the main heroes that help Nick Fury fight Doctor Doom's Masters of Evil. Spider-Man appears in its sequel Marvel: Ultimate Alliance 2 voiced by Benjamin Diskin.

He is also a playable character in Capcom's series of Marvel-based fighting games, first appearing in Marvel Super Heroes as well as every game in the Marvel vs. Capcom series of games starting from Marvel Super Heroes vs. Street Fighter. For Marvel Super Heroes and the first two games, he was voiced by Patrick Chilvers. But for the next one which was entitled Ultimate Marvel vs. Capcom 3, it was voiced by Josh Keaton and for the 2017 game Marvel vs. Capcom: Infinite, it was voiced by Robbie Daymond.

While not appearing in the main series due to licensing issues from Sony, Spider-Man appears in Marvel Super Hero Squad, Marvel Super Hero Squad: The Infinity Gauntlet, and Marvel Super Hero Squad Online as a playable character. For Marvel Super Hero Squad and Marvel Super Hero Squad: The Infinity Gauntlet, he is voiced by Josh Keaton and for Marvel Super Hero Squad Online, all male Spider-Man characters are voiced by Mikey Kelley and Yuri Lowenthal. He appears as a playable character in the Facebook game Marvel: Avengers Alliance and its companion games Marvel: Avengers Alliance Tactics and Marvel: Avengers Alliance 2.

Spider-Man appears as a non-playable character in the 2003 game, X2: Wolverine's Revenge voiced again by an uncredited Rino Romano. In a deleted scene, Wolverine encounters Spider-Man off of his home turf. Spider-Man states that he heard about the big breakout at the Void and rode out to the town on the charter bus with the other superheroes who can't fly or teleport. When Spider-Man asks if Wolverine needs help fighting Magneto, Wolverine has him deal with the chaos in town until Damage Control arrives.

He is also mentioned in the 2013 video game Deadpool. Spider-Man is a playable character in the 2014 and 2015 games Disney Infinity: Marvel Super Heroes and Disney Infinity 3.0, with Drake Bell reprising his role from the 2012 Ultimate Spider-Man series.

The Amazing Spider-Man is a game based on the 2012 film of the same name for the PlayStation 3 and the Xbox 360. A sequel, The Amazing Spider-Man 2, was released in 2014 along with the film of the same name. Spider-Man is voiced by Sam Riegel for both of these games.

A new Spider-Man video game was announced during the Sony Electronic Entertainment Expo 2016 Press Conference under the working title "Spider-Man PS4" with the hashtag #spidermanPS4. Yuri Lowenthal reprises his role as Spider-Man from Marvel Super Hero Squad Online and Spider-Man Unlimited.

Spider-Man appears as a playable character in various mobile games including Marvel Future Fight, Marvel Contest of Champions, Marvel Puzzle Quest, and Marvel Strike Force.

Attractions
Spider-Man headlines as the main protagonist in 1999's The Amazing Adventures of Spider-Man attraction located at Universal Orlando's Islands of Adventure in Orlando, Florida and Universal Studios Japan in Osaka, Japan. The ride is considered to be one of the most groundbreaking in theme park history as it combines 3-D film, ride movement, and special effects for the very first time. The plot centers around Spider-Man battling the evil Sinister Syndicate, who has stolen the Statue of Liberty using an anti-gravity gun and threatens to destroy it unless the city surrenders to them.
Walt Disney Imagineering, in collaboration with Disney's Marvel Studios and Disney's Marvel Themed Entertainment divisions, is developing a Spider-Man ride. It will be part of the Avengers Campus area of Disney's California Adventure, and Walt Disney Studios Park in Paris that are slated to open around 2020.

Web series
 Spider-Man appears in several episodes of the stop-motion animated web series Marvel Superheroes: What the--?!.

Unofficial media

Series
Italian Spiderman, an Australian film parody of Italian action–adventure films of the 1960s and 1970s, first released on YouTube in 2007.

Fan films
Spider-Man: an unauthorized short film directed by Donald F. Glut and released in 1969.
3 Dev Adam: a 1974 Turkish cult film, in which Spider-Man is featured as a villainous crime boss.
Spider-Man Versus Kraven the Hunter: a 1974 short film written and directed by Bruce Cardozo, endorsed by Marvel Comics and authorized by Stan Lee.
Viva Spider-Man: a 1989 student film. Its creator, Jim Krieg, would later write for Spider-Man: The Animated Series.
The Green Goblin's Last Stand: a 1992 fan film, based on The Amazing Spider-Man comic book story "The Night Gwen Stacy Died", directed, written, and starring actor-stuntman Dan Poole. It was acclaimed for its high-risk stunts and guerrilla marketing.
Spider-Man Lives: A Miles Morales Story is a 2015 Spider-Man fan film based on Miles Morales.

See also 
 List of Spider-Man enemies in other media
 Green Goblin in other media

Notes

References

External links 
 King Features: The Amazing Spider-Man (comic strip official site)